Simons Architects (SA) is a fifteen-person (four partners & eleven staff) architecture, design, and planning firm located in Portland, Maine.

Background
SA was first established in New York City in 1983 by Scott Simons, FAIA and has since produced a body of work that includes cultural, institutional, academic, and residential projects of great substance and beauty. The studio is credited as designer of the LEED Platinum certified Coastal Maine Botanical Gardens Bosarge Family Education Center in association with Maclay Architects.  It became the "greenest building" in Maine and was awarded "Net Zero Energy Building of the Year" in 2012 by the North East Sustainable Energy Association (NESEA). SA is also the architect of record for the 2010 renovation and addition to the Portland Public Library, many other Maine libraries, educational buildings, and the 2014 renovation and addition to the "transformational" Casco Bay Lines Ferry Terminal. Staff from the firm have also participated in juries for national library awards and many regional and statewide AIA awards programs. The work of this firm has been recognized nationally for innovative design, attention to detail, inclusion of multiple stakeholders on public projects, and is seen as one of the key architects in the area. In 2015, Simons Architects developed a Master Plan for the Portland Museum of Art, which includes a 1981 addition designed by Henry N. Cobb of I.M. Pei & Partners. In 2017 the firm designed the Brattleboro Music Center and Chamber Music Hall in Vermont that was recognized with design awards from AIA New England, AIA Vermont, and AIA Maine. Since its founding in 1995, the Portland, ME studio has been recognized with over 25 design awards.

Notable projects 

 Portland Public Library - Portland, Maine 
 Bosarge Family Education Center (Net-Zero Energy, LEED Platinum) - Boothbay, Maine 
 Casco Bay Lines Ferry Terminal - Portland, Maine 
Brattleboro Music Center - Brattleboro, Vermont 
Pondicherry House (Net-Zero Energy, LEED Platinum)- Mount Desert Island, Maine 
 Franklin Theater (LEED Silver) - Portland, Maine
 Hillside House - Yarmouth, Maine
 Waynflete Arts Center - Portland, Maine
 Freeport Community Center - Freeport, Maine
 Tilton Academic Building - Tilton, New Hampshire
 Knox County Courthouse - Rockland, Maine
 SMCC Lighthouse Art Studio - South Portland, Maine
 Baxter Building Renovation - Portland, Maine
 Ronald McDonald House - Portland, Maine
Portland Museum of Art Campus Master Plan 
Bangor Public Library Renovation and Addition 
 Portland Public Library - Burbank Branch 
Bigelow Laboratory for Ocean Sciences - Dormitory and Visiting Scientist Residence 
 Patrons Oxford Insurance Offices

In progress 

Falmouth Memorial Library - Falmouth, Maine (2016)
Rice Public Library - Kittery, Maine (2018)
Tilton School Student Center - Tilton, New Hampshire (2018)
Ecology School Dining Common (Living Building Challenge) - Saco, Maine (2015)

List of awards and honors 
 2009 AIA New Hampshire Excellence in Architecture Award
 2010 Learning by Design Citation of Excellence
 2010 Outstanding Design, American School & University Educational Awards
 2010 Greater Portland Landmarks, Preservation Honor Award
 2011 Maine Preservation Honor Award
 2012 Maine AIA Honor Award for Design Excellence
 2012 AIA Vermont Award for Design Excellence
 2012 AIA New England Award for Design Excellence
 2013 The Phoenix Best Non-Gallery Art Space
 2013 Northeast Sustainable Energy Association (NESEA) Zero Net Energy Award
 2013 AIA Maine Committee on the Environment (COTE) Residential Merit Award
 2013 AIA Maine Committee on the Environment (COTE) Institutional/Commercial Citation Award
 2014 AIA Maine Design Merit Award
 2014 AIA New England Honorable Mention
 2015 ACEC of Maine Special Recognition Award
 2015 AIA New Hampshire Honor Award
 2015 Maine Preservation Honor Award
2016 AIA Maine Honor Award
2017 AIA Maine Honor Award for Design Excellence in Unbuilt Design: Jesup Memorial Library
2018 Wood Design National Award: Green Building with Wood
2018 Greater Portland Landmarks Award: State Theater
2018 AIA Maine Award for Design Excellence: Brattleboro Music Center
2018 AIA Maine Award for Design Excellence: Patrons Oxford Insurance Office Building
 2018 AIA Maine Award for Design Excellence: Shimmield Residence Hall at Bigelow Labs

References

External links 
 , the company's official website
 Scott Simons Architects on Architizer
 Casco Bay Ferry Lines Terminal Renovation

Architecture firms based in New York City
Architecture firms based in Maine
Companies based in Portland, Maine
Design companies established in 1983
1983 establishments in New York City
Privately held companies based in Maine